Nuray Lale (born 28 March 1962 Akcurun) is a Turkish-German writer and translator.

She arrived to Germany thanks to family reunification and could study health sciences at the University of Bielefeld, with a postgraduate degree in psycho-pedagogy at the University of Düsseldorf.

Works
 Düş sarayim (2004)
 Şirin Aydın: Içimde ufuklar / Horizonte in mir (Deutsche Übertragung, 2004)

References and external links
 

Living people

Turkish writers
Turkish emigrants to West Germany
1962 births
21st-century Turkish women writers
21st-century Turkish writers
21st-century German writers
21st-century German women writers
21st-century translators
German translators
Turkish translators
People from Bielefeld
Heinrich Heine University Düsseldorf alumni